Brian Flynn (7 June 1929 – 3 August 1986) was an Australian cricketer. He played in fifteen first-class matches for Queensland between 1952 and 1956.

See also
 List of Queensland first-class cricketers

References

External links
 

1929 births
1986 deaths
Australian cricketers
Queensland cricketers
Cricketers from Sydney